The high jump is a field event in athletics.

High jump, High Jump, or highjump may also refer to:

Arts, entertainment, and media
 High Jump (film), a 1959 British film
 High Jump (game), two-player strategy boardgame from Somalia
 Highjump (Transformers), a member of the Micromasters

Military expedition
 Operation Highjump, 1946–7 U.S. Navy expedition to the Antarctic

Sports
 Puissance, high jump competition in showjumping
 The high jump event in freestyle skating and the similar free jump in the same sport

See also
 High diving
 :Category:Suicides by jumping